Tenor Madness Too! is an album by saxophonist Ricky Ford which was recorded in 1992 and released on the Muse label.

Reception

The AllMusic review by Scott Yanow stated "Veteran tenors Yusef Lateef and Ricky Ford team up for this frequently explosive set. .. one's main focus is on the intense playing of the two great tenors, who battle it out in fiery fashion".

Track listing
All compositions by Yusef Lateef
 "Brother Moody" – 6:44
 "Brother Turrentine" – 9:54
 "IBN YL" – 12:25
 "Brother Rollins" – 11:56
 "Brother Heath" – 7:54
 "Brother Shorter" – 7:14
 "Brother Henderson" – 15:14

Personnel 
Yusef Lateef, Ricky Ford - tenor saxophone
Avery Sharpe – electric bass 
Kamal Sabir – drums

References 

Yusef Lateef albums
Ricky Ford albums
1996 albums